Paul Herman (March 29, 1946 – March 29, 2022) was an American actor. He was best known for playing Randy in David O. Russell's dramedy Silver Linings Playbook (2012) and Whispers DiTullio in Martin Scorsese's crime epic The Irishman (2019).

Career
His other appearances in movies include Once Upon a Time in America, At Close Range, We Own the Night, Heat, Crazy Heart, Quick Change, Sleepers, Cop Land, The Fan, Analyze That, The Day Trippers, and American Hustle. He had a recurring role on The Sopranos as Peter "Beansie" Gaeta, as well as another HBO series, Entourage, as Vincent Chase's accountant, Marvin.

Herman also played minor background characters in two other Scorsese crime films. In Goodfellas, he was The Pittsburgh Connection, and in the montage sequence 'Back Home, Years Ago' in Scorsese's Casino, he was a gambler who rushes to the phone booth to place the same bet that Sam Rothstein (Robert De Niro) did.

In 2009's Crazy Heart, Herman played the manager of Jeff Bridges' character.

Herman received a Screen Actors Guild Award and Critics Choice Award as part of the ensemble cast of 2013's American Hustle.

Personal life
Herman, along with his brother Charlie, ran the Columbus Cafe in the 1990s. Located across from Lincoln Center, it was frequented by actors, ballet dancers, gangsters, and FBI and DEA agents. Herman also had a small ownership stake in the cafe, along with Mikhail Baryshnikov as well as other actors.

Death
Herman died on his 76th birthday on March 29, 2022.

Filmography

Film

Television

References

External links

1946 births
2022 deaths
American male film actors
American male television actors
People from Brooklyn
Male actors from New York City
20th-century American male actors
21st-century American male actors